The Nintendo Gateway System is a version of the Super Nintendo Entertainment System, Game Boy, Game Boy Color, Game Boy Advance, Nintendo 64, or GameCube that was installed on some Northwest, Singapore Airlines, Air China, Air Canada, Alitalia-Linee Aeree Italiane, All Nippon Airways, British Midland International, Kuwait Airways, Malaysia Airlines, Thai Airways, and Virgin Atlantic passenger aircraft, as well as certain hotels with LodgeNet, NXTV, or Quadriga, from late 1993 up until the late 2000s. 

It was a series of video game consoles rather than a single console, specialized for airlines and hotels, featured in about 40,000 airline seats and 955,000 hotel rooms. It was one of the first in-seat airline entertainment services, provided by Matsushita Avionics, Rockwell Collins, and Thales Avionics. Its official website was discontinued in mid-2008, but units have been seen as late as 2013 for Nintendo 64 in hotels, and as late as 2012 for Game Boy and Game Boy Color on Singapore Airlines. 

It was part of a much larger computer system that allowed air passengers to not only play video games, but also watch movies and shows, listen to music, talk on the phone, and even shop while in-flight, before the rise of the internet. Upon its release, there were 10 games installed in the system, which included The Legend of Zelda: A Link to the Past, F-Zero and Super Mario World. Future plans for the system were to have it installed in hotels and cruise ships as well. 

The controller, or remote, for the airline version of the Gateway System had a button setup similar to the Super NES controller. It also doubled as a remote for the movies and music aspect of the system. Hotels had modified versions of the original console controllers. LodgeNet was the most widespread pay-per-view system for hotels that used it. 

LodgeNet partnered with Nintendo to bring video games directly into guest hotel rooms through streaming over the LodgeNet server, with the special LodgeNet controller plugging directly into the TV or LodgeNet set-top box, transmitting the game over phone lines connected to a central game server. Pricing was usually $6.95 plus tax for 1 hour of video games. After 1 hour, the game would immediately stop and prompt the user to purchase more play time. Many games were modified for single-player play only.

History
In late 1993, LodgeNet launched its on-demand hospitality service, including worldwide delivery of Super NES games to hotel guests via its proprietary building-wide networks. LodgeNet eventually reported the system being installed in 200,000 hotel guest rooms by April 1996, and 530,000 guest rooms by mid-1999. By April 1996, LodgeNet reported that its partnership with Nintendo to deliver Super NES games had yielded 200,000 worldwide hotel guest room installations. On June 16, 1998, Nintendo and LodgeNet entered a 10-year licensing agreement for an "aggressive" upgrade to add Nintendo 64 support to their existing 500,000 Super NES equipped guest room installations. LodgeNet says that within the system's previous five years to date, the system had "caused Nintendo to become the most successful new product rollout in the history of the hotel pay-per-view industry". LodgeNet reported that within the middle of 1998 alone, 35 million hotel guests encountered the Nintendo name as an integral amenity, and it reported sales of more than 54 million minutes of Nintendo-based gameplay.

On June 10, 1999, LodgeNet and Nintendo began expanding and upgrading their existing Super NES buildout to include Nintendo 64 support. In mid-1999, LodgeNet reported that its 530,000 hotel room installations were increasing at a rate of 11,000 rooms per month. In September 2000, Nintendo and LodgeNet began delivering newly released Nintendo 64 games to hotel rooms at more than 1,000 hotel sites, concurrently with the games' retail releases, demonstrating "the capacity to update LodgeNet's interactive digital systems with fresh content virtually overnight".

Games
Games are offered for six Nintendo platforms, the Super Nintendo Entertainment System, the Game Boy, the Game Boy Color, the Game Boy Advance, the Nintendo 64, and the GameCube, with support for the Nintendo Entertainment System planned. While GB, GBC, and GBA games are exclusive to the airlines, the N64 and GC games are exclusive to the hotels, and the SNES is available for both.

Super Nintendo Entertainment System
There were 49 Super Nintendo Entertainment System titles available to play on LodgeNet hotel televisions and on airlines equipped with Nintendo Gateway System, which LodgeNet used for their hotel service. Some titles were not playable on airlines.

Blackthorne
Boogerman: A Pick and Flick Adventure (not available on airlines)
Boxing Legends of the Ring
The Brainies
ClayFighter: Tournament Edition (not available on airlines)
ClayFighter 2: Judgment Clay (not available on airlines)
Claymates
Donkey Kong Country
Donkey Kong Country 2: Diddy's Kong Quest (not available on airlines)
Dr. Mario (standalone, exclusive to the service)
Final Fight
F-Zero
Hagane: The Final Conflict
Hal's Hole in One Golf
Hangman (exclusive to the service)
Killer Instinct (not available on airlines)
Kirby's Dream Course
The Legend of Zelda: A Link to the Past
The Lost Vikings
The Lost Vikings 2
Mega Man X
NCAA Basketball (listed in a Nintendo Power article about the Gateway Service, unknown availability)
Noughts & Crosses (exclusive to the service)
Panel de Pon
Postcard Puzzle (exclusive to the service)
Prehistorik Man
Pro Mahjong Kiwame
Shanghai II: Dragon's Eye
Street Fighter II: The World Warrior
Street Fighter II: Hyper Fighting (not available on airlines)
Super Adventure Island
Super Bonk
Super Ghouls 'n Ghosts
Super Mario All-Stars
Super Mario All-Stars + Super Mario World (unknown availability)
Super Mario World
Super Metroid (not available on airlines)
Super Play Action Football
Super Punch-Out!!
Super Soccer
Super Solitaire
Super Street Fighter II (not available on airlines)
Super Tennis
True Golf Classics: Pebble Beach Golf Links (listed in a Nintendo Power article about the Gateway Service, unknown availability)
Tetris (standalone, exclusive to the service)
Tetris Attack
Tetris & Dr. Mario
Vegas Stakes
Wario's Woods

Nintendo 64
There were 38 Nintendo 64 titles available to play on LodgeNet hotel televisions.

1080° Snowboarding
Donkey Kong 64
Dr. Mario 64
Excitebike 64
Extreme-G
F-Zero X
Forsaken 64
Gauntlet Legends
Hydro Thunder
Iggy's Reckin' Balls
Kirby 64: The Crystal Shards
The Legend of Zelda: Majora's Mask
The Legend of Zelda: Ocarina of Time
Mario Golf
Mario Kart 64
Mario Party 3
Mario Tennis
Midway's Greatest Arcade Hits
Milo's Astro Lanes
Mortal Kombat 4
Namco Museum 64
The New Tetris
Paper Mario
Pilotwings 64
Pokémon Snap
Rampage 2: Universal Tour
Ready 2 Rumble Boxing
Rush 2: Extreme Racing USA
San Francisco Rush: Extreme Racing
Star Fox 64
Star Wars: Rogue Squadron
Super Mario 64
Super Smash Bros.
Turok 2: Seeds of Evil
Virtual Chess 64
Virtual Pool 64
Wave Race 64
Yoshi's Story

GameCube
There were 43 Nintendo GameCube titles available to play on LodgeNet hotel televisions.

1080° Avalanche
Animal Crossing
Backyard Baseball 2007
Battalion Wars
Chibi-Robo!
Custom Robo
Eternal Darkness: Sanity's Requiem
Final Fantasy Crystal Chronicles
Fire Emblem: Path of Radiance
Geist
Kirby Air Ride
The Legend of Zelda: Collector's Edition
The Legend of Zelda: Four Swords Adventures
The Legend of Zelda: Ocarina of Time Master Quest
The Legend of Zelda: Twilight Princess
The Legend of Zelda: The Wind Waker
Luigi's Mansion
Mario Golf: Toadstool Tour
Mario Kart: Double Dash!!
Mario Party 4
Mario Party 5
Mario Party 6
Mario Party 7
Mario Power Tennis
Metroid Prime
Metroid Prime 2: Echoes
Paper Mario: The Thousand-Year Door
Pikmin
Pikmin 2
Pokémon Channel
Pokémon Colosseum
Pokémon XD: Gale of Darkness
Star Fox: Assault
Star Wars Rogue Squadron II: Rogue Leader
Star Wars Rogue Squadron III: Rebel Strike
Super Mario Strikers
Super Mario Sunshine
TMNT
Tomb Raider: Legend
The Urbz: Sims in the City
Wario World
WarioWare, Inc.: Mega Party Games!
Wave Race: Blue Storm

Game Boy and Game Boy Color
There were 33 Game Boy/Game Boy Color titles available to play on airlines featuring Nintendo Gateway System.

Baseball
Dr. Mario
F1 Race
Game & Watch Gallery
Game & Watch Gallery 2
Game & Watch Gallery 3
Golf
Kirby's Dream Land 2
Kirby's Pinball Land
Kirby's Star Stacker
Mario Golf
Mario Tennis
Metroid II: Return of Samus
Picross 2
Pokémon Gold Version
Pokémon Silver Version
Pokémon Pinball
Pokémon Puzzle Challenge
Pokémon Red Version
Pokémon Blue Version
Pokémon Trading Card Game
Pokémon Yellow Version
Super Mario Bros. Deluxe
Super Mario Land
Super Mario Land 2
Tennis
The Legend of Zelda: Link's Awakening
The Legend of Zelda: Oracle of Ages
The Legend of Zelda: Oracle of Seasons
Wario Land: Super Mario Land 3
Wario Land II
Wario Land 3
Yakuman

Game Boy Advance
There were 13 Game Boy Advance titles available to play on airlines featuring Nintendo Gateway System.

Advance Wars 2: Black Hole Rising
Dr. Mario & Puzzle League
Fire Emblem: The Blazing Blade
Game & Watch Gallery 4
Kirby: Nightmare in Dream Land
Kirby & the Amazing Mirror
Mario Kart: Super Circuit
Mario Pinball Land
Pokémon Pinball: Ruby & Sapphire
Super Mario Advance 4: Super Mario Bros. 3
Super Mario World: Super Mario Advance 2
The Legend of Zelda: A Link to the Past
Wario Land 4

See also
 
 Interactive television
 Smart TV
 Sonifi Solutions

Notes

References

External links
 

Television technology
Nintendo hardware